Simona Halep was the defending champion, but did not participate since she qualified for the WTA Finals.

Andrea Petkovic won the tournament, defeating Flavia Pennetta in the final, 1–6, 6–4, 6–3.

Players

Alternates

Draw

Finals

Serdika group
Standings are determined by: 1. number of wins; 2. number of matches; 3. in two-players-ties, head-to-head records; 4. in three-players-ties, percentage of sets won, or of games won; 5. steering-committee decision.

Sredets group
Standings are determined by: 1. number of wins; 2. number of matches; 3. in two-players-ties, head-to-head records; 4. in three-players-ties, percentage of sets won, or of games won; 5. steering-committee decision.

References

External links
Official Draw

WTA Tournament of Champions
Garanti Koza WTA Tournament of Champions – Singles
Tennis tournaments in Bulgaria
Sports competitions in Sofia
Garanti Koza WTA Tournament of Champions – Singles